The 2020 Clemson vs. Notre Dame football game was a regular season college football game between ACC members Clemson (Undefeated and ranked #1 in the nation) and Notre Dame (Undefeated and ranked #4 in the nation). The game took place at Notre Dame Stadium in South Bend, Indiana on the campus of the University of Notre Dame. The game is notable for being Notre Dame's first victory over a team ranked #1 in the nation since 1993.

Background
Clemson entered the game as the number-one team in the country, led by quarterback Trevor Lawrence that season. However, Trevor Lawrence ultimately didn't play in the game, as he tested positive for COVID-19 on October 30, 2020. Instead, true freshman DJ Uiagalelei would make his second career start at quarterback for the undefeated Clemson Tigers. Notre Dame entered the game led by quarterback Ian Book, who had led the Irish to a then-winning streak of 12 games (the streak would end at 16 games in a rematch against Clemson in the 2020 ACC Championship Game)

Due to most major conferences restricting play this season to conference opponents only due to the COVID-19 pandemic, the independent Notre Dame Fighting Irish agreed to play an ACC conference schedule for the 2020 season; Notre Dame is a member of the ACC for all other sports besides football and ice hockey.

The game
Notre Dame opened things up very quickly in the game with a strong first quarter. After a holding penalty on Clemson, Kyren Williams busted off a 65 yard touchdown run that eclipsed the total points scored by Notre Dame in the previous matchup against Clemson and put Notre Dame up 7–0. Following a Clemson punt, Notre Dame would put together a ten play drive that led to Jonathan Doerer field goal of 24 yards that put Notre Dame up 10–0. Clemson would waste no time on the following possession as they scored on a 53 yard pass from DJ Uiagalelei to Cornell Powell on a 4 play drive that took less than two minutes of game time to put Clemson on the board as they trailed 7–10. The second quarter would also favor Notre Dame as they would put together another drive that had double digit plays with a thirteen play drive that led to Doerer making another field goal of 27 yards to extend Notre Dame's lead to 13–7. Clemson would match Notre Dame with a drive that would also feature a double digit number of plays. In an eleven play drive by Clemson, it would end with B.T. Potter kicking a field goal of 25 yards to put Clemson within three points again as the score was 10–13 in favor of Notre Dame. Following a Notre Dame possession that ended in a punt, Clemson would fumble the ball that was recovered by Jeremiah Owusu-Koramoah for a touchdown and gave Notre Dame a 20–10 lead. On the following possession, Clemson would once again fumble the ball, but Notre Dame stalled on the next drive that led to Doerer kicking his third field goal of the night at 45 yards to give Notre Dame a 23–10 lead. Clemson responded with a 45 yard field goal of their own as B.T. Potter kicked his second of the night just before halftime to put Clemson 13–23.

Clemson would dominate the third quarter with all ten of the points scored by Clemson. Clemson scored a field goal of 46 yards by B.T. Potter on the opening drive to pull Clemson within a touchdown with a score of 16–23. Following a three-and-out by Notre Dame, Clemson took 13 plays to even the score at 23–23 with Davis Allen catching a 10 yard pass from Uiagalelei. The fourth quarter would see Jonathan Doerer kick his fourth and final field goal of the night with a 44 yarder that allowed Notre Dame to regain the lead at 26–23. Clemson would quickly match that with B.T. Potter also kicking his fourth and final field goal of the night with a 30 yarder to tie the game again. Notre Dame would stall with a three-and-out that gave the ball back to Clemson who took twelve plays to gain their first lead of the game on a Travis Etienne run of 3 yards that put Clemson up 33–26. Notre Dame would turn the ball over on downs and then force Clemson into a three-and-out to get the ball back with 1:48 remaining in regulation. Notre Dame would embark on an 8 play, 91 yard drive that featured multiple first downs and a deep pass to Avery Davis to set up a first and goal situation. On third and goal, Ian Book would throw a 4 yard pass to Davis to tie the game at 33–33 with 22 seconds remaining.

In the first overtime, it took Clemson only 2 plays to regain the lead on a 1 yard run by Uiagalelei to make it 40–33. Notre Dame would respond on twice the number of plays with a 3 yard run by Kyren Williams to tie it at 40–40 once again. Notre Dame opened the second overtime with a 6 play drive that saw Kyren Williams score on another 3 yard run to put Notre Dame up for good at 47–40 with Williams having his third touchdown of the game. Clemson would get one more chance following that score, but were not able to convert and Notre Dame would gain a victory of 47–40 in double overtime.

Game statistics

Team statistics

Game leaders

Aftermath
For the first time since 1993, Notre Dame would defeat a team that was ranked #1 in the nation. Notre Dame would go on to win the remaining regular season games to finish 10–0 before losses to Clemson in the ACC Championship and Alabama in the College Football Playoff in the 2021 Rose Bowl to complete the season at 10–2 to give the Irish their fourth straight season of 10 or more wins. Clemson would finish their regular season at 9–1 and defeat Notre Dame in the ACC Championship game that was a rematch. Clemson would ultimately lose to Ohio State in the 2021 Sugar Bowl to finish with identical record of 10–2 as well.

The win over Clemson would be Notre Dame's first victory over Clemson since the 1977 matchup where Notre Dame defeated Clemson in Clemson, South Carolina with a score of 21–17.

Media coverage
The game was televised by NBC as part of its long-standing broadcast rights to Notre Dame home games. The game was briefly moved to USA Network for coverage of a victory speech by president-elect Joe Biden following the 2020 presidential election, before returning to NBC for the remainder. The game was seen by an average of 10 million viewers, which made it NBC's highest-rated Notre Dame telecast since 2005, and the highest-rated regular season game of the 2020 season overall.

ESPN broadcast College GameDay from South Bend on the morning of the game.

See also
 1993 Florida State vs. Notre Dame football game
 2005 USC vs. Notre Dame football game

References

2020 Atlantic Coast Conference football season
vs. Clemson 2020
vs. Notre Dame 2020
November 2020 sports events in the United States
2020 in sports in Indiana